The Olympics of Grace was an early international multi-sport event for women that was held from 29–31 May 1931 in Florence, Italy. Primarily composed of track and field events and contested by women from eleven European countries, the competition was a forerunner to women's participation in the European Athletics Championships.

History
The formation of the International Women's Sports Federation (FSFI) and the hosting of the 1921 Women's World Games in Monte Carlo, led by Alice Milliat, marked the growth of organised international women's sport. The Grand Council of Fascism in Italy was partly encouraging of the movement but stated that, regardless of sporting prowess, motherhood was a woman's most important role. Women's engagement in sport fitted the views of Benito Mussolini, the Italian dictator, whose feminine ideal concerned rural, strong and fertile women, in opposition to ostentation and cosmopolitanism. Still, reflecting the social background of emphasising femininity over pure athleticism for women, the 1931 sporting event was designated the Olympics of Grace. International promotional material around the event stressed it "will be devoted not to contests of speed, strength or skill, but to exhibitions of gymnastic grace".

The tournament was supported by Italian women's sports organisations as well as the FSFI. It was not sanctioned by the International Olympic Committee (IOC). Both this event and the Women's World Games led to greater inclusion of women at the Olympic Games.  The number of Olympic women athletes increased over five-fold from the 1920 to the 1936 Summer Olympics (65 to 331).

In addition to the track and field events, a dancing competition was held and the winner's cup was presented to a troupe of German dancers under the tutelage of Mary Wigman, one of the originators of modern expressionist dance. It is not known what other events were held in Florence besides dance and athletics.

Medal summary

Athletics

Participation
Eleven European countries competed at the Olympics of Grace. Final standings.

References

Women's World Games
Women's athletics competitions
1931 in multi-sport events
1931 in athletics (track and field)
1931 in Italian sport
Athletics competitions in Italy
International sports competitions hosted by Italy
Sport in Florence
Multi-sport events in Italy
May 1931 sports events